Like a Kiss that Never Ends is an album by David Murray released on the Canadian Justin Time label. Recorded in 2000 and released in 2001, the album contains performances by Murray, Andrew Cyrille, John Hicks and Ray Drummond.

Reception
The AllMusic review by Steve Loewy stated: "While Like a Kiss That Never Ends is not pivotal in Murray's distinguished career, it nonetheless retains the high quality that has marked so much of his work." Critic Gary Giddins described "Blues for Felix" as "one of Murray's best pieces in years", and concluded that the album was "all pleasure, no regrets".

Track listing
 "Blues for Felix" - 7:21  
 "Like a Kiss That Never Ends" - 12:44  
 "Dedication" (Drummond) -  7:14  
 "Suki, Suki Now" - 9:43  
 "Ruben's Theme Song" - 6:30  
 "Mo' Bass" - 7:40  
 "Let's Cool One' (Monk) - 9:50
All compositions by David Murray except as indicated  
Recorded June 5, 2000

Personnel
David Murray - tenor saxophone, bass clarinet
Andrew Cyrille - drums
John Hicks - piano
Ray Drummond - bass

References

2001 albums
David Murray (saxophonist) albums